The Taoiseach (plural: Taoisigh) is the head of government of Ireland. Prior to the enactment of the Constitution of Ireland in 1937, the head of government was referred to as the President of the Executive Council. This office was first held by W. T. Cosgrave from 1922 to 1932, and then by Éamon de Valera from 1932 to 1937. By convention Taoisigh are numbered to include Cosgrave, for example Micheál Martin is considered the 15th Taoiseach.

Electoral history

Periods in office

Cumulative days served

Length of individual periods

Longevity

Age on entering/leaving office

Cabinet positions
Listed here are cabinet positions held either before or during holding the office of Taoiseach or President of the Executive Council.

Education

Living officeholders
There are currently five living former Taoisigh:

Timeline of living/deceased officeholders

See also
History of the Republic of Ireland
Irish heads of government since 1919
Politics of the Republic of Ireland
Records of members of the Oireachtas

Notes

References

External links
Official website of the Taoiseach

Ireland
Department of the Taoiseach